The Holocaust Memorial at California Palace of the Legion of Honor is a Holocaust memorial in San Francisco, California, in Lincoln Park, overlooking the Golden Gate. It was created by artist George Segal out of white painted bronze. In 1981 the city invited Segal to submit a design for its competition; his plaster maquette is held by the Jewish Museum in New York. The bronze cast was installed in 1984.

Symbolism

Several of the bodies in the sculpture were designed to be symbolic. One of the bodies resembles Jesus, another is of a woman holding an apple, evoking Eve. Both symbolize the connection between Jews and Christians. The only standing man, a survivor, is thought to be the sculptor's representation of Margaret Bourke-White's famous Life Magazine 1945 photograph of the liberation of Buchenwald. Segal's friends posed for the casts, so they are not emaciated like the corpses found at the liberation of Buchenwald. This was an intentional choice by Segal, as was the star formation of the corpses.

Vandalism
The memorial has been vandalized several times. The most common types of vandalism of the memorial are both the graffitiing of swastikas and the splashing of red paint.
Segal perceives the vandalism as a reminder of the continued existence of antisemitism.

References

External links
 

Holocaust memorials
Outdoor sculptures in San Francisco
Monuments and memorials in California
Statues in San Francisco
Bronze sculptures in California
1984 sculptures
1984 establishments in California
Sculpture gardens, trails and parks in California
Sculptures of men in California
Sculptures of women in California
Vandalized works of art in California